Petronas (died November 11, 865) was a notable Byzantine general and leading aristocrat during the mid-9th century. After Theophilos' death, he played a role in the ending of Iconoclasm, but was sidelined along with his brother Bardas during the minority of his nephew, Michael III, when power was held by the regent Theoktistos. In 855, Petronas and Bardas encouraged Michael III to seize control of the government: Theoktistos was murdered, Theodora banished to a monastery, Bardas became Michael's chief minister, and Petronas was tasked with the war against the Arabs. In 863, he scored a crushing victory at the Battle of Lalakaon, a feat which marked the gradual beginning of a Byzantine counter-offensive in the East.

Biography
Petronas was born to the  Marinos and Theoktiste, and was the younger brother of Bardas and Empress Theodora, the wife of Emperor Theophilos. Three other sisters, Kalomaria, Sophia, and Irene, are recorded by Theophanes Continuatus.

In 842, as Theophilos lay dying, Petronas and the eunuch Theoktistos carried out the execution of the  Theophobos, a former Khurramite convert and general, whose troops had rebelled and proclaimed him emperor at Sinope some years before. Despite his kinship with Theophilos, the tale is told that the Emperor once had Petronas stripped naked and flogged in public because he had built a palace that overshadowed the house of a widow, in contravention of the law. The palace itself was then torn down, and both the building materials and the plot were left to the widow.

When Theophilos died in 842, Theodora was left as regent to her infant son, Michael III. A regency council was set up headed by Theodora, along with Petronas and Bardas and their relative Sergios Niketiates. Petronas is said to have urged Theodora to rescind Theophilos's iconoclastic policies, which eventually resulted in the restoration of the veneration of images in the so-called "Triumph of Orthodoxy" on 11 March 843. Soon after that, Petronas and Bardas were successfully sidelined by the  Theoktistos, while Niketiates was killed in an expedition against the Cretan Saracens, leaving the eunuch minister the dominant figure throughout Theodora's regency.

In 855, however, Michael III turned fifteen and thus came nominally of age. The young ruler began resenting the dominance of his mother and of Theoktistos, especially after they selected Eudokia Dekapolitissa as his bride, disregarding Michael's attachment to his mistress, Eudokia Ingerina. Supported by his uncles Bardas and Petronas, Emperor Michael had Theoktistos seized and killed in late 855, while Petronas undertook the confinement of the empress and her daughters into a monastery. In this position, he displayed remarkable energy and ability, and amongst the most important of his policies was a more aggressive stance against the Arabs in the East. Consequently, Petronas was appointed  of the powerful Thracesian Theme. On his first campaign, against the Paulicians of Tephrike in 856, he plundered his way through the emirate of Melitene and the Paulician lands to Samosata and Amida in Upper Mesopotamia. After penetrating deeper into Arab territory than any Byzantine commander since the beginning of the Muslim conquests, he returned victorious with many captives.

In 863, an Arab army, led by the emir of Melitene, Umar al-Aqta, raided deep into Byzantine territory, reaching the Black Sea coast at Amisos. Petronas was placed in charge of all Byzantine troops assembling to confront the invasion, and through a brilliant coordination effort, three separate forces managed to converge on the Arab army, encircle it, and destroy it at the Battle of Lalakaon on September 3, 863. Petronas carried his defeated enemy's head to Constantinople, where he was honored with a triumphal entrance by his nephew.

The defeat of the Arabs and their Paulician allies became a turning point in the Arab–Byzantine wars. With this victory, Petronas and Bardas were able to secure their eastern borders, strengthen the Byzantine state, and set the stage for the Byzantine conquests of the 10th century. The Byzantine chroniclers add that the victorious general did not survive for long after his victory. A hagiography, written by a contemporary, claims that Petronas died on the same day as his spiritual father Saint Anthony the Younger, two years and two months after routing the Arab armies. He was buried in the Gastria Monastery, where his stone sarcophagus was placed opposite those of his sister, the Empress Theodora, and his nieces.

References

Sources

Byzantine generals
Byzantine officials
9th-century Byzantine people
865 deaths
Patricii
Year of birth unknown
Byzantine people of the Arab–Byzantine wars
Phrygian dynasty
Domestics of the Schools
Magistroi
Burials at the Monastery of Gastria
Governors of the Thracesian Theme